Ernest Van der Hallen (Lier, June 2, 1898 - there, February 24, 1948) was a Flemish writer and Catholic youth leader during the Interbellum. Van der Hallen was an inspirational figure for the Flemish nationalist youth movement.

Books 
 Ridder Arnold (1924)
 Sprookjes uit de zomernacht (1924)
 Stille uren bij primitieve meesters (1924)
 Begenadigden uit mystiek Vlaanderen (1925)
 Kristiaan de godsgezant (1928)
 Liturgisch gebedenboek voor studenten (1931)
 Brieven aan een jonge vriend (1932)
 De wind waait (1932, verhalen)
 Een jongen uit Vlaanderen (1934)
 Zes dagen (1935)
 De aarde roept (1936)
 Charles de Foucauld (1937)
 Tussen Atlas en Pyreneeën (1938)
 Cheiks, pelgrims en rabbijnen (1940)
 Oost-zuid-oost. Herinneringen aan Lybië, Egypte, Syrië en Turkije (1941)
 Op eigen grond (1942)
 Het vertelsel van den dichter zonder hart (1942)
 Brouwer (1943, biography of Adriaen Brouwer)
 Steden in vlammen (1943)
 Vertelsels in juni (1944)
 Kroniek der onnozele kinderen (1947)
 Felix Timmermans (1948)
 Brieven aan Elckerlyc (1948, under the name J. van de Wijngaert)
 Vreemdelingenlegioen (1948)
 Vaarwel, mijn vriend (1949)

References

Sources 
 Armand Boni: Ernest Van der Hallen, een silhouet; Davidsfonds - Leuven, 1950
 Bonifaas Luykx: "De wind waait", Ernest Van der Hallen, begenadigde en jeugdleider; Bertennest - Kortrijk, 1999

External links 
 
 Van der Hallen in Vlaamse Schrijvers

1898 births
1948 deaths
Flemish writers
Belgian Roman Catholics
People from Lier, Belgium